The Mazar Dam is a concrete-face rock-fill dam on the Paute River Cañar Province, Ecuador. The purpose of the dam is hydroelectric power generation and it is located directly upstream of the Paute Dam as part of the Amaluza-Molino project. Construction on the dam began in 2004; the generators were commissioned in 2010 and the remaining works were completed in 2011.

References

Dams completed in 2010
Energy infrastructure completed in 2010
Dams in Ecuador
Concrete-face rock-fill dams
Hydroelectric power stations in Ecuador
Buildings and structures in Cañar Province